The Río Achiguate is a river in the south of Guatemala. Its sources are located in the Sierra Madre range, on the southern slopes of the Volcán de Fuego in the departments of Sacatepéquez and Escuintla. The river flows southwards through the coastal lowlands of Escuintla to the Pacific Ocean.

The Achiquate river's proximity to the active Fuego volcano increases the risks of inundations and mudflows.

References

Rivers of Guatemala